Acleris rubivorella is a species of moth of the family Tortricidae. It is found in southern European Russia and Kazakhstan.

The larvae feed on Betula, Malus, Spiraea, Polygonum and Rubus species.

References

	

Moths described in 1962
rubivorella
Moths of Europe
Moths of Asia